Brachidontes is a genus of mussels in the family Mytilidae.

Species
The following are the species currently included in Brachidontes:

 Brachidontes adamsianus (Dunker, 1857) — Adams mussel 
 Brachidontes crebristriatus (Conrad, 1837)
 Brachidontes darwinianus (d'Orbigny, 1842)
 Brachidontes domingensis (Lamarck, 1819) — Santo Domingo mussel 
 Brachidontes dunkeri M. Huber, 2015
 Brachidontes erosus (Lamarck, 1819)
 Brachidontes esmeraldensis (Olsson, 1961)
 Brachidontes evansi (E. A. Smith, 1903)
 Brachidontes exustus (Linnaeus, 1758) — scorched mussel
 Brachidontes granoliratus (G. B. Sowerby III, 1909)
 Brachidontes granulatus (Hanley, 1843)
 Brachidontes houstonius Bartsch & Rehder, 1939
 Brachidontes modiolus (Linnaeus, 1767) — yellow mussel
 Brachidontes mutabilis (Gould, 1861) — mutable mussel 
 Brachidontes niger (Gmelin, 1791)
 Brachidontes pharaonis (Fischer P., 1870)
 Brachidontes playasensis (Pilsbry & Olsson, 1935)
 Brachidontes puniceus (Gmelin, 1791)
 Brachidontes puntarenensis (Pilsbry & Lowe, 1932)
 Brachidontes rodriguezii (d'Orbigny, 1842)
 Brachidontes rostratus (Dunker, 1857)
 Brachidontes sculptus (Iredale, 1939)
 Brachidontes semilaevis (Menke, 1848)
 Brachidontes setiger (Dunker, 1857)
 Brachidontes striatulus (Hanley, 1843)
 Brachidontes subramosus (Hanley, 1843)
 Brachidontes subsulcatus (Dunker, 1857)
 Brachidontes undulatus (Dunker, 1857)
 Brachidontes ustulatus (Lamarck, 1819)
 Brachidontes variabilis (Krauss, 1848) — variable mussel; synonym: Brachidontes semistriatus
 Brachidontes virgiliae (Barnard, 1964)
 Brachidontes willetsi (Marwick, 1928)

References

Mytilidae
Bivalve genera